This is an overview of active and former artists signed to Kill Rock Stars.

Active artists
 Boats
 Caleb Nichols
 Comet Gain
 COMMANDO
 Deerhoof
 Erase Errata
 Cameron Esposito
 Foxx Bodies
 Elliott Fullam
 Gold Chains & Sue Cie
 Gravy Train!!!!
 Horse Feathers
 The Inflorescence
 Kinski (band)
 Logan Lynn
 Macromantics
 The Makers
 Mecca Normal
 MAITA
 Mi’ens
 Mika Miko
 Nedelle
 Thao Nguyen
 The Thermals
 Numbers
 The Old Haunts
 Anna Oxygen
 The Paper Chase
 Linda Perry
 Ryan Cassata
 Shoplifting
 Shy Child
 Slumber Party
 Shaylee
 Stereo Total
 Marnie Stern
 TEKE::TEKE
 Tele Novella
 They Shoot Horses, Don't They?
 Mary Timony
 Wimps

Passive/defunct/alumnus artists
 Bangs
 Bikini Kill
 Bratmobile
 C Average
 The Cribs
 Elliott Smith
 Free Kitten
 godheadSilo
 Gossip
 Harvey Danger
 Hovercraft
 Huggy Bear
 Jeff Hanson
 Lungleg
 Mary Lou Lord
 Miranda July
 Sleater-Kinney
 Team Dresch
 The Decemberists
 Unwound
 Wrangler Brutes
 Xiu Xiu

See also
 Kill Rock Stars
 5 Rue Christine

Kill Rock Stars